Nina Nymark Jakobsen (née Andersen) (born 28 September 1972) is a former Norwegian footballer, world champion and Olympic medalist.

She debuted for the Norwegian national team in 1993, and played 50 matches for the national team. She received a bronze medal at the 1996 Summer Olympics in Atlanta. Her twin sister Anne Nymark Andersen is also a football player, and the two sisters played simultaneously for the national football team. They both became world champions in 1995.

Her clubs include IL Sandviken and IF Fløya.

After retiring as a player, she has spent four years as assistant coach at IF Fløya, leaving the club after the 2005 season. In the 2008 season, Nymark Jacobsen coached the club Fløya, first together with Rune Repvik, and later with coach Rune Brustad.

References

External links

1972 births
Living people
Norwegian women's footballers
Footballers at the 1996 Summer Olympics
Olympic footballers of Norway
Olympic bronze medalists for Norway
Toppserien players
SK Brann Kvinner players
Norwegian twins
Norwegian women's football managers
Olympic medalists in football
Twin sportspeople
1995 FIFA Women's World Cup players
FIFA Women's World Cup-winning players
Medalists at the 1996 Summer Olympics
UEFA Women's Championship-winning players
Women's association footballers not categorized by position

Norway women's international footballers